Miss Earth Venezuela 2019 was the 3rd edition of Miss Earth Venezuela, held on 25 August 2019 at Theater of Chacao Cultural Center in Miranda. Diana Silva of Lara crowned her successor Michell Castellanos of Guárico at the end of the event. she represented Venezuela at Miss Earth 2019 but Unplaced.

Final results

Official contestants 

30 contestants competed for the title.

References

External links 

 Miss Earth Venezuela Official Page

Miss Earth Venezuela
2019 in Venezuela
2019 beauty pageants